Konstantin Anatolyevich Valkov (November 11, 1971- ) is a Russian former Cosmonaut. He was selected as part of the TsPK-12 Cosmonaut group in 1997.

Biography

Early life and education

Valkov was born in  Kamensk-Uralsky, Sverdlovsk Oblast, Russian SFSR on November 11, 1971. In 1994, he graduated from Barnaul Higher Military Air School of Pilots and subsequently became a Colonel in the Russian Air Force.

Cosmonaut career

Valkov was selected as part of the TsPK-12 group of cosmonauts to train at the Yuri Gagarin Cosmonaut Training Center in 1997. He then completed basic training in 1999. He retired without flying in space in 2012.

References

1971 births
Living people
Russian cosmonauts
People from Kamensk-Uralsky